Vivien Léránt (born 5 August 1990 in Siófok) is a retired Hungarian handballer. She played regularly for the Hungarian junior national team and was member of the team that won the silver medal on the 2009 Junior European Championship.

Achievements 
Women Handball Austria:
Winner: 2009, 2010, 2011
ÖHB Cup:
Winner: 2009, 2010, 2011
EHF Champions League:
Finalist: 2008
Semifinalist: 2009
Junior European Championship:
Silver Medalist: 2009

References 

1990 births
Living people
People from Siófok
Hungarian female handball players
Expatriate handball players
Hungarian expatriate sportspeople in Austria
Sportspeople from Somogy County